Rock paper scissors (also known by other orderings of the three items, with "rock" sometimes being called "stone," or as Rochambeau, roshambo, or ro-sham-bo) is a hand game, usually played between two people, in which each player simultaneously forms one of three shapes with an outstretched hand. These shapes are "rock" (a closed fist), "paper" (a flat hand), and "scissors" (a fist with the index finger and middle finger extended, forming a V). The earliest form of "rock paper scissors"-style game originated in China and was subsequently imported into Japan, where it reached its modern standardized form, before being spread throughout the world in the early 20th century.

A simultaneous, zero-sum game, it has three possible outcomes: a draw, a win or a loss. A player who decides to play rock will beat another player who has chosen scissors ("rock crushes scissors" or "breaks scissors" or sometimes "blunts scissors"), but will lose to one who has played paper ("paper covers rock"); a play of paper will lose to a play of scissors ("scissors cuts paper"). If both players choose the same shape, the game is tied and is usually immediately replayed to break the tie.

Rock paper scissors is often used as a fair choosing method between two people, similar to coin flipping, drawing straws, or throwing dice in order to settle a dispute or make an unbiased group decision. Unlike truly random selection methods, however, rock paper scissors can be played with a degree of skill by recognizing and exploiting non-random behavior in opponents.

Etymology 
The name Rochambeau, sometimes spelled roshambo or ro-sham-bo and used mainly in the Western United States, is a reference to Count Rochambeau, who, according to a widespread legend, played the game during the American Revolutionary War. This legend is apocryphal as all evidence points to the game first becoming known in the United States during the 1930s. It is unclear why this name became associated with the game, with hypotheses ranging from a slight phonetic similarity with the Japanese name jan-ken-pon to the presence of a statue of Rochambeau in a neighborhood of Washington, D.C.

Gameplay 

The players may start by counting to three aloud, or by speaking the name of the game (e.g. "Rock! Paper! Scissors!"), raising one hand in a fist and swinging it down with each syllable onto their other hand (or in a less common variant, holding it behind their back). They then "throw" or "shoot" by extending their selected sign towards their opponent on what would have been the fourth count, often saying the word "shoot" while doing so. Variations include a version where players throw immediately on the third count (thus throwing on the count of "Scissors!"), a version including five counts rather than four ("Rock! Paper! Scissors! Says! Shoot!", almost exclusively localized in the United States to Long Island and some parts of New York City), and a version where players shake their hands three times before "throwing".

History

Origins

The first known mention of the game was in the book  by the Ming-dynasty writer  (  1600), who wrote that the game dated back to the time of the Han dynasty (206 BCE – 220 CE). In the book, the game was called shoushiling. Li Rihua's book Note of Liuyanzhai  also mentions this game, calling it shoushiling (t. 手勢令; s. 手势令), huozhitou (t. 豁指頭; s. 豁指头), or huaquan (划拳).

Throughout Japanese history there are frequent references to sansukumi-ken, meaning ken (fist) games "of the three who are afraid of one another" (i.e. A beats B, B beats C, and C beats A). This type of game originated in China before being imported to Japan and subsequently also becoming popular among the Japanese.

The earliest Japanese sansukumi-ken game was known as mushi-ken (虫拳), which was imported directly from China. In mushi-ken the "frog" (represented by the thumb) triumphs over the "slug" (represented by the little finger), which, in turn prevails over the "snake" (represented by the index finger), which triumphs over the "frog". Although this game was imported from China the Japanese version differs in the animals represented. In adopting the game, the original Chinese characters for the poisonous centipede (蜈蜙) were apparently confused with the characters for the slug (蛞蝓). The most popular sansukumi-ken game in Japan was kitsune-ken (狐拳). In the game, a supernatural fox called a kitsune (狐) defeats the village head, the village head (庄屋) defeats the hunter, and the hunter (猟師) defeats the fox. Kitsune-ken, unlike mushi-ken or rock–paper–scissors, is played by making gestures with both hands.

Today, the best-known sansukumi-ken is called , which is a variation of the Chinese games introduced in the 17th century. Jan-ken uses the rock, paper, and scissors signs and is the game that the modern version of rock paper scissors derives from directly. Hand-games using gestures to represent the three conflicting elements of rock, paper, and scissors have been most common since the modern version of the game was created in the late 19th century, between the Edo and Meiji periods.

Spread beyond East Asia 
By the early 20th century, rock paper scissors had spread beyond East Asia, especially through increased Japanese contact with the west. Its English-language name is therefore taken from a translation of the names of the three Japanese hand-gestures for rock, paper and scissors: elsewhere in East Asia the open-palm gesture represents "cloth" rather than "paper". The shape of the scissors is also adopted from the Japanese style.

A 1921 article about cricket in the Sydney Morning Herald described "stone, scissors, and paper" as a "Teutonic method of drawing lots", which the writer "came across when travelling on the Continent once". Another article, from the same year, in the Washington Herald described it as a method of "Chinese gambling".
In Britain in 1924 it was described in a letter to The Times as a hand game, possibly of Mediterranean origin, called "zhot".
A reader then wrote in to say that the game "zhot" referred to was evidently Jan-ken-pon, which she had often seen played throughout Japan. Although at this date the game appears to have been new enough to British readers to need explaining, the appearance by 1927 of a popular thriller with the title Scissors Cut Paper, followed by Stone Blunts Scissors (1929), suggests it quickly became popular.

The game is referred to in two of Hildegard G. Frey's novels in the Campfire Girls series: The Campfire Girls Go Motoring (1916)  and The Campfire Girls Larks and Pranks (1917), which suggests that it was known in America at least that early. The first passage where it appears says "In order that no feelings might be involved in any way over which car we other girls traveled in, Nyoda, Solomon-like, proposed that she and Gladys play "John Kempo" for us. (That isn't spelled right, but no matter.)"  There's no explanation in any of the places where it is referenced of what the game actually is. This suggests that the author at least believed that the game was well-known enough in America that her readers would understand the reference.

In 1927 La Vie au patronage, a children's magazine in France, described it in detail, referring to it as a "jeu japonais" ("Japanese game"). Its French name, "Chi-fou-mi", is based on the Old Japanese words for "one, two, three" ("hi, fu, mi").

A 1932 New York Times article on the Tokyo rush hour describes the rules of the game for the benefit of American readers, suggesting it was not at that time widely known in the U.S. Likewise, the trick-taking card game “Jan-Ken-Po”, first published in 1934, describes the rules of the hand-game without mentioning any American game along the lines of “rock paper scissors”.  The 1933 edition of the Compton's Pictured Encyclopedia described it as a common method of settling disputes between children in its article on Japan; the name was given as "John Kem Po" and the article pointedly asserted, "This is such a good way of deciding an argument that American boys and girls might like to practice it too."

Strategies 

It is impossible to gain an advantage over an opponent that chooses their move uniformly at random. However, it is possible to gain a significant advantage over a non-random player by predicting their move, which can be done by exploiting psychological effects or by analyzing statistical patterns of their past behavior. As a result, there have been programming competitions for algorithms that play rock paper scissors.

During tournaments, players often prepare their sequence of three gestures prior to the tournament's commencement. Some tournament players employ tactics to confuse or trick the other player into making an illegal move, resulting in a loss. One such tactic is to shout the name of one move before throwing another, in order to misdirect and confuse their opponent.

The "rock" move, in particular, is notable in that it is typically represented by a closed fist—often identical to the fist made by players during the initial countdown. If a player is attempting to beat their opponent based on quickly reading their hand gesture as the players are making their moves, it is possible to determine if the opponent is about to throw "rock" based on their lack of hand movement, as both "scissors" and "paper" require the player to reposition their hand. This can likewise be used to deceive an anticipating opponent by keeping one's fist closed until the last possible moment, leading them to believe that you are about to throw "rock".

Algorithms 
As a consequence of rock paper scissors programming contests, many strong algorithms have emerged. For example, Iocaine Powder, which won the First International RoShamBo Programming Competition in 1999, uses a heuristically designed compilation of strategies. For each strategy it employs, it also has six metastrategies which defeat second-guessing, triple-guessing, as well as second-guessing the opponent, and so on. The optimal strategy or metastrategy is chosen based on past performance. The main strategies it employs are history matching, frequency analysis, and random guessing. Its strongest strategy, history matching, searches for a sequence in the past that matches the last few moves in order to predict the next move of the algorithm. In frequency analysis, the program simply identifies the most frequently played move. The random guess is a fallback method that is used to prevent a devastating loss in the event that the other strategies fail. There have since been some innovations, such as using multiple history-matching schemes that each match a different aspect of the history – for example, the opponent's moves, the program's own moves, or a combination of both. There have also been other algorithms based on Markov chains.

In 2012, researchers from the Ishikawa Watanabe Laboratory at the University of Tokyo created a robot hand that can play rock paper scissors with a 100% win rate against a human opponent. Using a high-speed camera the robot recognizes within one millisecond which shape the human hand is making, then produces the corresponding winning shape.

Variations 

Players have developed numerous cultural and personal variations on the game, from simply playing the same game with different objects, to expanding into more weapons and rules, to giving their own name to the game in their national language.

Adapted rules 

In Korea, where the standard version of the game is called gawi-bawi-bo, a two-player upgraded version exists by the name muk-jji-ppa. After showing their hands, the player with the winning throw shouts "muk-jji-ppa!" upon which both players throw again. If they throw differently (for example, rock and paper, or paper and scissors), whoever wins this second round shouts "muk-jji-ppa!" and thus the play continues until both players throw the same item (for example, rock and rock), at which point whoever was the last winner becomes the actual winner. In another popular two-handed variant, one player will shout "minus one" after the initial play. Each player removes one hand, and the winner is decided by the remaining hands in play.

In Japan, a strip game variant of rock paper scissors is known as 野球拳 (Yakyuken). The loser of each round removes an article of clothing. The game is a minor part of porn culture in Japan and other Asian countries after the influence of TV variety shows and Soft On Demand.

In the Philippines, the game is called jak-en-poy (from the Japanese jan-ken-pon). In a longer version of the game, a four-line song is sung, with hand gestures displayed at the end of each (or the final) line: "Jack-en-poy! / Hali-hali-hoy! / Sino'ng matalo, / siya'ng unggoy!" ("Jack-en-poy! / Hali-hali-hoy! / Whoever loses is the monkey!") In the former case, the person with the most wins at the end of the song, wins the game. A shorter version of the game uses the chant "Bato-bato-pick" ("Rock-rock-pick [i.e. choose]") instead.

A multiple player variation can be played: Players stand in a circle and all throw at once. If rock, paper, and scissors are all thrown, it is a stalemate, and they rethrow. If only two throws are present, all players with the losing throw are eliminated. Play continues until only the winner remains.

Different weapons 
In the Malaysian version of the game, "scissors" is replaced by "bird," represented with the finger tips of five fingers brought together to form a beak. The open palm represents "water". Bird beats water (by drinking it); stone beats bird (by hitting it); and stone loses to water (because it sinks in it).

Singapore also has a related hand-game called "ji gu pa", where "ji" refers to the bird gesture, "gu" refers to the stone gesture, and "pa" refers to the water gesture. The game is played by two players using both hands. At the same time, they both say, "ji gu pa!" At "pa!" they both show two open-palmed hands. One player then changes his hand gestures while calling his new combination out (e.g., "pa gu!"). At the same time, the other player changes his hand gestures as well. If one of his hand gestures is the same as the other one, that hand is "out" and he puts it behind his back; he is no longer able to play that hand for the rest of the round. The players take turns in this fashion, until one player loses by having both hands sent "out". "Ji gu pa" is most likely a transcription of the Japanese names for the different hand gestures in the original jan-ken game, "choki" (scissors), "guu" (rock) and "paa" (paper).

In Indonesia, the game is called suten, suit or just sut, and the three signs are elephant (slightly raised thumb), human (outstreched index finger) and ant (outstreched pinky finger). Elephant is stronger than human, human is stronger than ant, but elephant is afraid of the ant.

Using the same tripartite division, there is a full-body variation in lieu of the hand signs called "Bear, Hunter, Ninja". In this iteration the participants stand back-to-back and at the count of three (or ro-sham-bo as is traditional) turn around facing each other using their arms evoking one of the totems. The players' choices break down as: Hunter shoots bear; Bear eats ninja; Ninja kills hunter. The game was popularized with a FedEx commercial where warehouse employees had too much free time on their hands.

Additional weapons 
Generalized rock-paper-scissors games where the players have a choice of more than three weapons have been studied. Any variation of rock paper scissors is an oriented graph, where the nodes represent the symbols (weapons) choosable by the players, and an edge from A to B means that A defeats B. Each oriented graph is a potentially playable rock paper scissors game. According to theoretical calculations, the number of distinguishable (i. e. not isomorphic) oriented graphs grows with the number of weapons = 3, 4, 5, ... as follows:
 7; 42; 582; 21,480; 2,142,288; 575,016,219; 415,939,243,032; … .  

The French game "pierre, papier, ciseaux, puits" (stone, paper, scissors, well) is unbalanced; both the stone and scissors fall in the well and lose to it, while paper covers both stone and well. This means two "weapons", well and paper, can defeat two moves, while the other two weapons each defeat only one of the other three choices. The rock has no advantage to well, so optimal strategy is to play each of the other objects (paper, scissors and well) one third of the time.

Variants in which the number of moves is an odd number and each move defeats exactly half of the other moves while being defeated by the other half are typically considered. Variations with up to 101 different moves have been published. Adding new gestures has the effect of reducing the odds of a tie, while increasing the complexity of the game. The probability of a tie in an odd-number-of-weapons game can be calculated based on the number of weapons n as 1/n, so the probability of a tie is 1/3 in standard rock paper scissors, but 1/5 in a version that offered five moves instead of three.

One popular five-weapon expansion is "", invented by Sam Kass and Karen Bryla, which adds "Spock" and "lizard" to the standard three choices. "Spock" is signified with the Star Trek Vulcan salute, while "lizard" is shown by forming the hand into a sock-puppet-like mouth. Spock smashes scissors and vaporizes rock; he is poisoned by lizard and disproved by paper. Lizard poisons Spock and eats paper; it is crushed by rock and decapitated by scissors. This variant was mentioned in a 2005 article in The Times of London and was later the subject of an episode of the American sitcom The Big Bang Theory in 2008 (as rock-paper-scissors-lizard-Spock).

A game-theoretic analysis showed that 4 variants of 582 possible variations using 5 different weapons have non-trivial mixed strategy equilibria. The most representative game of these 4 is "rock, paper, scissors, fire, water". Rock beats scissors, paper beats rock, scissors beats paper, fire beats everything except water, and water is beaten by everything except it beats fire. Nevertheless, experiments show that people underuse water and overuse rock, paper, and scissors in this game.

Analogues in real life

Lizard mating strategies 

The common side-blotched lizard (Uta stansburiana) exhibits a rock paper scissors pattern in its mating strategies. Of its three throat color types of males, "orange beats blue, blue beats yellow, and yellow beats orange" in competition for females, which is similar to the rules of rock-paper-scissors.

Bacteria 
Some bacteria also exhibit a rock paper scissors dynamic when they engage in antibiotic production. The theory for this finding was demonstrated by computer simulation and in the laboratory by Benjamin Kerr, working at Stanford University with Brendan Bohannan. Additional in vitro results demonstrate rock paper scissors dynamics in additional species of bacteria. Biologist Benjamin C. Kirkup Jr. demonstrated that these antibiotics, bacteriocins, were active as Escherichia coli compete with each other in the intestines of mice, and that the rock paper scissors dynamics allowed for the continued competition among strains: antibiotic-producers defeat antibiotic-sensitives; antibiotic-resisters multiply and withstand and out-compete the antibiotic-producers, letting antibiotic-sensitives multiply and out-compete others; until antibiotic-producers multiply again.

Rock paper scissors is the subject of continued research in bacterial ecology and evolution. It is considered one of the basic applications of game theory and non-linear dynamics to bacteriology. Models of evolution demonstrate how intragenomic competition can lead to rock paper scissors dynamics from a relatively general evolutionary model. The general nature of this basic non-transitive model is widely applied in theoretical biology to explore bacterial ecology and evolution.

Mechanical devices and geometrical constructions 
In the televised robot combat competition BattleBots, relations between "lifters, which had wedged sides and could use forklift-like prongs to flip pure wedges", "spinners, which were smooth, circular wedges with blades on their bottom side for disabling and breaking lifters", and "pure wedges, which could still flip spinners" are analogical to relations in rock paper scissors games and called "robot Darwinism".

Instances of usage

American court case 
In 2006, American federal judge Gregory Presnell from the Middle District of Florida ordered opposing sides in a lengthy court case to settle a trivial (but lengthily debated) point over the appropriate place for a deposition using the game of rock paper scissors. The ruling in Avista Management v. Wausau Underwriters stated:

Auction house selection 

In 2005, when Takashi Hashiyama, CEO of Japanese television equipment manufacturer Maspro Denkoh, decided to auction off the collection of Impressionist paintings owned by his corporation, including works by Paul Cézanne, Pablo Picasso, and Vincent van Gogh, he contacted two leading auction houses, Christie's International and Sotheby's Holdings, seeking their proposals on how they would bring the collection to the market as well as how they would maximize the profits from the sale. Both firms made elaborate proposals, but neither was persuasive enough to earn Hashiyama's approval. Unwilling to split up the collection into separate auctions, Hashiyama asked the firms to decide between themselves who would hold the auction, which included Cézanne's Large Trees Under the Jas de Bouffan, estimated to be worth between $12 million to $16 million.

The houses were unable to reach a decision. Hashiyama told the two firms to play rock paper scissors to decide who would get the rights to the auction, explaining that "it probably looks strange to others, but I believe this is the best way to decide between two things which are equally good."

The auction houses had a weekend to come up with a choice of move. Christie's went to the 11-year-old twin daughters of the international director of Christie's Impressionist and Modern Art Department Nicholas Maclean, who suggested "scissors" because "Everybody expects you to choose 'rock'." Sotheby's said that they treated it as a game of chance and had no particular strategy for the game, but went with "paper". Christie's won the match and sold the $20 million collection, earning millions of dollars of commission for the auction house.

FA Women's Super League match 
Prior to a 26 October 2018 match in the FA Women's Super League, the referee, upon being without a coin for the pregame coin toss, had the team captains play rock paper scissors to determine which team would kick-off. The referee was subsequently suspended for three weeks by The Football Association.

Play by chimpanzees 
In Japan, researchers have taught chimpanzees to identify winning hands according to the rules of rock paper scissors.

Game design 

In many games, it is common for a group of possible choices to interact in a rock paper scissors style, where each selection is strong against a particular choice, but weak against another. Such mechanics can make a game somewhat self-balancing, prevent gameplay from being overwhelmed by a single dominant strategy and single dominant type of unit.

Many card-based video games in Japan use the rock paper scissors system as their core fighting system, with the winner of each round being able to carry out their designated attack. In Alex Kidd in Miracle World, the player has to win games of rock paper scissors against each boss to proceed. Others use simple variants of rock paper scissors as subgames.

Many Nintendo role-playing games prominently feature a rock paper scissors gameplay element. In Pokémon, there is a rock paper scissors element in the type effectiveness system. For example, a Grass-typed Pokémon is weak to Fire, Fire is weak to Water, and Water is weak to Grass. In the 3DS remake of Mario & Luigi: Superstar Saga and Mario & Luigi: Bowser's Inside Story, the battles in the second mode use a “Power Triangle” system based on the game's three attack types: Melee, Ranged, and Flying. In the Fire Emblem series of strategy role-playing games, the Weapon Triangle and Trinity of Magic influence the hit and damage rates of weapon types based on whether they are at an advantage or a disadvantage in their respective rock paper scissors system. In the Super Smash Bros. series, the three basic actions used during battles are described in their respective rock paper scissors system: attack, defense, and grab.

Tournaments 

Various competitive rock paper scissors tournaments have been organised by different groups.

World Rock Paper Scissors Association 

Started in 2015 the WRPSA has hosted Professional Rock Paper Scissors Tournaments all around the World.

World Rock Paper Scissors Society 
Hosted Professional Rock Paper Scissors Tournaments from 2002–2009. These open, competitive championships have been widely attended by players from around the world and have attracted widespread international media attention. WRPS events are noted for their large cash prizes, elaborate staging, and colorful competitors.
In 2004, the championships were broadcast on the U.S. television network Fox Sports Net (later known as Bally Sports), with the winner being Lee Rammage, who went on to compete in at least one subsequent championship. The 2007 tournament was won by Andrea Farina. The last tournament hosted by the World RPS Society was in Toronto, Canada, on November 14, 2009.

UK championships 
Several RPS events have been organised in the United Kingdom by Wacky Nation. The 1st UK Championship took place on 13 July 2007, and were then held annually. The 2019 event was won by Ellie Mac, who went on to pick up the cash prize of £20,000 but was unable to double her earnings in 2020 due to the coronavirus outbreak.

USARPS tournaments 
USA Rock Paper Scissors League is sponsored by Bud Light. Leo Bryan Pacis was the first commissioner of the USARPS. Cody Louis Brown was elected as the second commissioner of the USARPS in 2014.

In April 2006, the inaugural USARPS Championship was held in Las Vegas. Following months of regional qualifying tournaments held across the US, 257 players were flown to Las Vegas for a single-elimination tournament at the House of Blues where the winner received $50,000. The tournament was shown on the A&E Network on 12 June 2006.

The $50,000 2007 USARPS Tournament took place at the Las Vegas Mandalay Bay in May 2007.

In 2008, Sean "Wicked Fingers" Sears beat 300 other contestants and walked out of the Mandalay Bay Hotel and Casino with $50,000 after defeating Julie "Bulldog" Crossley in the finals.

The inaugural Budweiser International Rock, Paper, Scissors Federation Championship was held in Beijing, China after the close of the 2008 Summer Olympics at Club Bud. A Belfast man won the competition.

National XtremeRPS Competition 2007–2008 
The XtremeRPS National Competition is a US nationwide RPS competition with Preliminary Qualifying contests that started in January 2007 and ended in May 2008, followed by regional finals in June and July 2008. The national finals were to be held in Des Moines, Iowa, in August 2008, with a chance to win up to $5,000.

Guinness Book of World Records 
The largest rock paper scissors tournament hosted 2,950 players and was achieved by Oomba, Inc. (USA) at Gen Con 2014 in Indianapolis, Indiana, United States, on 17 August 2014.

World Series 
Former Celebrity Poker Showdown host and USARPS Head Referee Phil Gordon has hosted an annual $500 World Series of Rock Paper Scissors event in conjunction with the World Series of Poker since 2005. The winner of the WSORPS receives an entry into the WSOP Main Event. The event is an annual fundraiser for the "Cancer Research and Prevention Foundation" via Gordon's charity Bad Beat on Cancer. Poker player Annie Duke won the Second Annual World Series of Rock Paper Scissors. The tournament is taped by ESPN and highlights are covered during "The Nuts" section of ESPN's annual WSOP broadcast. 2009 was the fifth year of the tournament.

Jackpot En Poy of Eat Bulaga! 
Jackpot En Poy is a game segment on the Philippines' longest running noontime variety show, Eat Bulaga!. The game is based on the classic children's game rock paper scissors (Jak-en-poy in Filipino, derived from the Japanese Jan-ken-pon) where four players are paired to compete in the three-round segment. In the first round, the first pair plays against each other until one player wins three times. The next pair then plays against each other in the second round. The winners from the first two rounds then compete against each other to finally determine the ultimate winner. The winner of the game then moves on to the final round. In the final round, the player is presented with several Dabarkads, each holding different amounts of cash prize. The player will then pick three Dabarkads who he or she will play rock paper scissors against. The player plays against them one at a time. If the player wins against any of the Eat Bulaga! hosts, he or she will win the cash prize.

See also 

 Chopsticks (hand game)
 Matching pennies, the binary equivalent
 Morra (game), another hand game for deciding trivial matters
 Intransitive dice
 Rock paper scissors and human social cyclic behavior
 Simultaneous action selection
 Mixed strategy

References 
Notes

Bibliography

 
 Culin, Stewart (1895) Korean Games, With Notes on the Corresponding Games at China and Japan. (evidence of nonexistence of rock paper scissors in the West)
 Gomme, Alice Bertha (1894, 1898) The traditional games of England, Scotland, and Ireland, 2 vols. (more evidence of nonexistence of rock paper scissors in the West)
 Opie, Iona & Opie, Peter (1969) Children's Games in Street and Playground Oxford University Press, London. (Details some variants on rock paper scissors such as 'Man, Earwig, Elephant' in Indonesia, and presents evidence for the existence of 'finger throwing games' in Egypt as early as 2000 B.C.)
 
 
 
 
 
 Baldwin, Wyatt (2017) The Official Rock Paper Scissors Handbook. The Official Strategy Guide of the World Rock Paper Scissors Association
 Walker, Douglas & Walker, Graham (2004) The Official Rock Paper Scissors Strategy Guide. Fireside. (strategy, tips and culture from the World Rock Paper Scissors Society).

External links 

 
 
 A biological example of rock paper scissors: Interview with biologist Barry Sinervo on the 7th Avenue Project Radio Show
 The World Rock Paper Scissors Association
 Rock Paper Scissors Programming Competition
 Rock Paper Scissors online remote edition 
 

 
Children's games
Games of chance
Hand games
Chinese games
Sampling (statistics)
Game theory game classes